Hypomyces orthosporus is a species of fungus belonging to the family Hypocreaceae.

It is native to Europe and Northern America.

References

Hypocreaceae